Ulvi may refer to:

Places
Ulvi, Ida-Viru County, village in Avinurme Parish, Ida-Viru County, Estonia
Ulvi, Lääne-Viru County, village in Rägavere Parish, Lääne-Viru County, Estonia

People
Ulvi Cemal Erkin (1906–1972), Turkish musician
Ulvi Rajab (1903–1938), Azerbaijani actor
Ulvi Uraz (1921–1974), Turkish actor and director
Ulvi Voog (born 1937), Estonian swimmer

Turkish masculine given names
Estonian feminine given names